Krnov–Głuchołazy railway is a main and branch line for railway transport in the Czech Republic and Poland. Originally it was built and operated by Mährisch-Schlesische Centralbahn (MSCB). It is a North-South railway line between Krnov and Głuchołazy, which runs parallel with the border between the two countries.

History
On 21 April 1870 MSCB gained concession to build a railway between Olmütz and Landesgrenze via Jägerndorf. Concession also included the rights for creating a branch line from Olbersdorf to Würbenthal in Prussia via Neisse, Troppau, Römerstadt .

On 1 October 1872 the line between Olmütz and Jägerndorf-Hennersdorf was temporarily  opened for freight traffic as well. Not so much later, on 15 October it was opened for passenger transport as well. Line on the other side of the border is operating since 1 December 1875.

MSCB was nationalised on 1 January 1895. The new owner and operator was the Imperial Royal Austrian State Railways. There were three pair of trains between Jägerndorf–Olmütz and Mährisch Schönberg. These train connections are available between Ziegenhals and Freiwaldau or Hannsdorf today as well.

After World War I line was transferred from Austria to Czechoslovakia and the line was operated by Czechoslovak State Railways (ČSD).

After Nazi Germany annexed Sudetenland, the line was transferred to German Reich Railway. On the timetables of those times it was shown as line 151 between Brieg–Neisse–Jägerndorf–Schönbrunn-Witkowitz.

After World War II operating of the line was divided between ČSD and Polish State Railways (PKP). There are corridor rails between the two countries which connect Krnov-Jesenik with the Polish territories. As all trains had to stop in Głuchołazy to change its locomotive. And there was no passenger traffic here up to 2006.

As Czechoslovakia was dissolved on 1 January 1993, all vehicles and the line were transferred to the new Czech Railways (ČD).

There is mainly only passenger transport to Jesenik. There are express trains on the line in every four hours between Ostrava-Svinov–Jesenik. There is only local transport from Krnov to Jindřichov ve Slezsku. Transit traffic includes only some trains to jelenti.

References

External links

 Šumperk–Krnov auf www.zelpage.cz 
 Głubczyce–Głuchołazy auf www.kolej-one.pl

Czechoslovakia–Poland relations
International railway lines
Railway lines in Poland
Railway lines in the Czech Republic